The 20th Mounted Brigade previously known as the 2/1st Lowland Mounted Brigade was a 2nd Line yeomanry brigade of the British Army during the First World War.  In July 1916 it was converted to a cyclist formation as 13th Cyclist Brigade and in November 1916 was redesignated as 9th Cyclist Brigade.  It was still in existence, in Ireland, at the end of the war.

Mounted Brigade
In accordance with the Territorial and Reserve Forces Act 1907 (7 Edw.7, c.9) which brought the Territorial Force into being, the TF was intended to be a home defence force for service during wartime and members could not be compelled to serve outside the country. However, on the outbreak of war on 4 August 1914, many members volunteered for Imperial Service.  Therefore, TF units were split in August and September 1914 into 1st Line (liable for overseas service) and 2nd Line (home service for those unable or unwilling to serve overseas) units.  Later, a 3rd Line was formed to act as a reserve, providing trained replacements for the 1st and 2nd Line regiments.  Similarly, by 1915 most 2nd Line yeomanry regiments were formed into 2nd Line mounted brigades with the same title and composition as the pre-war 1st Line formations.  Two other 2nd Line brigades (2/1st Southern Mounted Brigade and 2/1st Western Mounted Brigade) without 1st Line antecedents were also formed.

2/1st Lowland Mounted Brigade was a mirror formation of the 1st Line Lowland Mounted Brigade.  It was raised in Scotland and had under command the 2/1st Ayrshire (Earl of Carrick's Own) Yeomanry, the 2/1st Lanarkshire Yeomanry, and the 2/1st Lothians and Border Horse.  By March 1916, the brigade was at Dunbar, East Lothian.  On 31 March 1916, the remaining Mounted Brigades were ordered to be numbered in a single sequence and the brigade  became 21st Mounted Brigade, still at Dunbar under Scottish Command.

Cyclist Brigade
In July 1916 there was a major reorganization of 2nd Line yeomanry units in the United Kingdom.  All but 12 regiments were converted to cyclists and as a consequence the brigade was converted to 13th Cyclist Brigade.  Further reorganization in October and November 1916 saw the brigade redesignated as 9th Cyclist Brigade in November, still at Dunbar.  In July 1917, 2/1st Lothians and Border Horse moved to Haddington.

About May 1918 the Brigade moved to Ireland.  2/1st Ayrshire was stationed at Omagh, County Tyrone, the 2/1st Lanarkshire at Derry, and the 2/1st Lothians and Border Horse at Londonderry and Enniskillen, County Fermanagh.  There were no further changes before the end of the war.

See also

 Lowland Mounted Brigade for the 1st Line formation
 British yeomanry during the First World War
 Second line yeomanry regiments of the British Army

Notes

References

Bibliography
 
 
 

Cyclist units and formations of the British Army
Mounted Brigades of the British Army
Military units and formations disestablished in 1914
Military units and formations disestablished in 1918